Neukirch may refer to:

Germany
Neukirch, Baden-Württemberg, in the Bodensee district
Neukirch/Lausitz, in the district of Bautzen, Saxony
Neukirch (bei Königsbrück), in the district of Kamenz, Saxony

Switzerland
Neukirch an der Thur, a village in the canton of Thurgau

Australia
Neukirch, South Australia was a settlement now considered part of Ebenezer in the Barossa Valley

People
Detlef Neukirch (born 1940), German chess master
Karl Neukirch, a German gymnast (1864-1941)
Jürgen Neukirch, German mathematician (1937-1997)